Edward Adam Manfield (May 1, 1943 – March 29, 1999) was a professional American bridge player. He was a member of the U.S. team that won the Rosenblum Cup at the 1986 World Bridge Championships, after taking silver in 1982.

Biography

Manfield was born in the Bronx, New York City, and graduated from Harvard University in 1965. After serving in the Army, he earned a master's degree from the University of Virginia in 1972. Manfield was employed at the Federal Trade Commission and later became the head of a company called Binary Traders Inc.

Manfield was married three times; his first two marriages, to Lynn Johannesen, and JoAnn Wellens (later Sprung), ended in divorce. Manfield partnered with Wellens during their marriage from 1980–85. In The New York Times in 1983, Alan Truscott praised their performance along with pair Bob Fiske and Mickie Kivel, calling it, "Perhaps the best performance ever in New York by a team consisting of two mixed pairs."

He later remarried and died in 1999 of a heart attack at his home in Philadelphia. He was survived by his wife Melanie, their two children, Seth Manfield, a champion Magic: the Gathering player, and Sabrina, and his daughter from a previous marriage, Karen.

He was inducted into the ACBL Hall of Fame in 2003.

Bridge accomplishments

Honors

 ACBL Hall of Fame, 2003

Awards

 Herman Trophy (1) 1986

Wins

 North American Bridge Championships (11)
 Silodor Open Pairs (2) 1987, 1989 
 Wernher Open Pairs (1) 1985 
 Blue Ribbon Pairs (1) 1990 
 Grand National Teams (3) 1984, 1988, 1992 
 Vanderbilt (1) 1991 
 Mitchell Board-a-Match Teams (3) 1986, 1989, 1994

Runners-up

 North American Bridge Championships
 Silodor Open Pairs (2) 1981, 1996 
 Blue Ribbon Pairs (2) 1985, 1986 
 Grand National Teams (1) 1985 
 Reisinger (1) 1980 
 Spingold (2) 1979, 1981

References

External links
 
 

1943 births
1999 deaths
American contract bridge players
People from the Bronx
Harvard University alumni
University of Virginia alumni
Federal Trade Commission personnel